The spouse of the president of Singapore is sometimes called the first lady or first gentleman, although it is a term of courtesy not enshrined in the Constitution of Singapore. By tradition, an official portrait of the spouse of the president of Singapore is prominently displayed in government buildings alongside the portrait of the president, whose role as head of state is largely ceremonial.

In December 1959, Noor Aishah, wife of Singapore's first locally born head of state Yusof Ishak, became the first person to assume the role at the age of 26. Her biography, Puan Noor Aishah: Singapore's First Lady, was published in 2017.

On 14 September 2017, Mohammed Abdullah Alhabshee became the first male spouse of a president of Singapore, after his wife Halimah Yacob won the 2017 presidential election by an uncontested walkover.

List of spouses of the president of Singapore

See also 
 President of Singapore

Notes

References

1965 establishments in Singapore
 
Spouses of presidents of Singapore
Singapore